Caught Up is the fourth album by R&B musician Millie Jackson. It includes the hit singles, "(If Loving You Is Wrong) I Don't Want to Be Right", "The Rap" and "I'm Through Trying to Prove My Love to You." A concept album, Caught Up follows the story of a woman having an affair with a married man. Side A features Jackson singing from the mistress' point of view and Side B is told from the wife's point of view.

Track listing 
Side A
 "(If Loving You Is Wrong) I Don't Want to Be Right" (Homer Banks, Carl Hampton, Raymond Jackson) – 3:56
 "The Rap" (Millie Jackson) – 5:53
 "(If Loving You Is Wrong) I Don't Want to Be Right (Reprise)" (Homer Banks, Carl Hampton, Raymond Jackson) - 1:13
 "All I Want is a Fighting Chance" (Millie Jackson, King Sterling) – 2:37
 "I'm Tired of Hiding" (Phillip Mitchell, Billy Clements) – 3:51

Side B
 "It's All Over but the Shouting" (Millie Jackson, King Sterling) – 2:51
 "So Easy Going, So Hard Coming Back" (Phillip Mitchell) – 4:07
 "I'm Through Trying to Prove My Love to You" (Bobby Womack) – 5:48
 "Summer (The First Time)" (Bobby Goldsboro)  – 5:43

Personnel
Millie Jackson - vocals, concept
Barry Beckett - keyboards
David Hood - bass
Roger Hawkins - drums
Jimmy Johnson - guitar
Mike Lewis - orchestration
Tom Roady, Brad Shapiro - percussion
Technical
David Wiseltier - cover design

References

1974 albums
Millie Jackson albums
Albums produced by Brad Shapiro
Spring Records albums
Albums recorded at Muscle Shoals Sound Studio